Macrochlamys is a large genus of air-breathing land snails, terrestrial pulmonate gastropod mollusks in the family Ariophantidae.

Macrochlamys is the type genus of the subfamily Macrochlamydinae.

Species 
Species within the genus Macrochlamys include:
 Macrochlamys amboinensis (von Martens, 1864)
 Macrochlamys ceromatica (Morelet, 1881)
 Macrochlamys clessini Westerlund, 1902
 Macrochlamys indica Benson, 1832
 Macrochlamys kasnakowi (Westerlund, 1898)
 Macrochlamys sogdiana (Martens, 1871)
 Macrochlamys tersa (Issel, 1874)
 Macrochlamys turanica Martens, 1874
 Macrochlamys vitrinoides (Deshayes, 1831)
Synonyms
 Subgenus Macrochlamys (Petalochlamys) Godwin-Austen, 1907: synonym of Petalochlamys Godwin-Austen, 1907
 Macrochlamys (Petalochlamys) formosana (Schmacker & Boettger, 1891): synonym of Petalochlamys formosana (Schmacker & Boettger, 1891)
 Macrochlamys asamurai Panha, 1997: synonym of Sarika asamurai (Panha, 1997) (original combination)
 Macrochlamys formosana Schmacker & Boettger, 1891: synonym of Petalochlamys formosana (Schmacker & Boettger, 1891) (original combination)
 Macrochlamys fulgens Gude, 1900: synonym of Ovachlamys fulgens (Gude, 1900) (original combination)
 Macrochlamys humbloti Ancey 1902: synonym of Kalidos humbloti (Ancey, 1902) (original combination)

References 

 Bank, R. (2017). Classification of the Recent terrestrial Gastropoda of the World. Last update: July 16th, 2017

External links
 Gray, J. E. (1847). A list of the genera of recent Mollusca, their synonyma and types. Proceedings of the Zoological Society of London. (1847) 15: 129-219
 Godwin-Austen, H. H. (1882-1920). Land and freshwater Mollusca of India, including South Arabia, Baluchistan, Afghanistan, Kashmir, Nepal, Burmah, Pegu, Tenasserim, Malay Peninsula, Ceylon, and other islands of the Indian Ocean. Supplementary to Messrs. Theobald and Hanley's Conchologia Indica. London, Taylor & Francis.
  Pfeiffer, L. (1855-1856). Versuch einer Anordnung der Heliceen nach natürlichen Gruppen. Malakozoologische Blätter. 2(3): 112
 Benson, W. H. (1834). Observations on a collection of land and freshwater shells, formed in the Gangetic provinces of India. Proceedings of the Zoological Society of London. 2: 89-91
 Baker, H. B. (1938). Bensonies, new name for Bensonia Pfeiffer. Nautilus. 52(1): 33.

Ariophantidae
Taxa named by William Henry Benson